PT Medco Energi Internasional Tbk or MedcoEnergi is an Indonesian oil and gas company. The company operates in Trading and Holding & Related Operations, Exploration for and Production of Oil & Gas, Power, Services, Chemicals and Rental of properties.

History
The company was founded by Indonesian businessman Arifin Panigoro in 1980 and is headquartered in Jakarta, Indonesia. In October 2015, the company bought an interest in the Singa gas field in the Lematang Block located in South Sumatra for $22 million and, in May 2019, the company acquired Ophir Energy in a deal valued at $517.6 million.

Also in 2015, the company acquired the Lundin Petroleum AB's Indonesian Oil & Gas asset for $22 million. Since 2020, the company is producing gas form the Meliwis Field, East Java.

As of December 2021, the company has clinched a deal with ConocoPhillips to acquire the assets of ConocoPhillips Indonesia Holding Ltd (CIHL). The acquisition is expected to be concluded in the first quarter of 2022.

Overview of personnel
The group's current President Director is Hilmi Panigoro. Roberto Lorato serves as the group's Director and CEO.

See also
List of petroleum companies

References

External links 
 

1994 initial public offerings
Companies based in Jakarta
Companies listed on the Indonesia Stock Exchange
Indonesian companies established in 1980
Oil and gas companies of Indonesia